Guillermo Molina Valdés (May 14, 1909 – August 21, 1997) was an American Negro league pitcher in 1929 and 1930.

A native of Brooklyn, New York, Molina was the son of fellow Negro leaguer Tinti Molina. He made his debut in 1929 with the Cuban Stars (West) and played for the Stars again the following season. Molina died in Chicago, Illinois in 1997 at age 86.

References

External links
 and Seamheads

1909 births
1997 deaths
Cuban Stars (West) players
Baseball pitchers
Baseball players from New York (state)
Sportspeople from Brooklyn
Baseball players from New York City
American sportspeople of Cuban descent
20th-century African-American sportspeople